Richard Hall (born 3 July 1945) is a former professional footballer who played as a defender. He played seven seasons with the Dallas Tornado in the North American Soccer League. Born in England, he earned four caps with the United States national team between 1973 and 1975. He later coached high school boys soccer in Dallas, Texas.

Club career
In 1970 Hall moved to the U.S. from England and signed with the Dallas Tornado of the North American Soccer League (NASL). He spent the next seven seasons in Dallas. In 1971 the Tornado won the NASL championship as Hall was named a first team All Star. He was named a second team All Star in 1972 and 1974 before being named to the first team for a second time in 1975.

International career
After gaining his U.S. citizenship, Hall earned four caps with the U.S. national team between 1973 and 1975. His first game was a 2–0 loss to Mexico on 16 October 1973. He played in two losses to Haiti in November 1972. His last game came in a 6–0 loss to Argentina on 21 August 1975.

Coaching career
In 1971 Hall became the boys' soccer coach at Greenhill School in Addison, Texas. In his thirty-six seasons at Greenhill, Hall has won over five hundred games and fifteen Southwest Preparatory Conference titles . He retired from coaching in 2010.

External links
 
 Newspaper article profiling Coach Hall
 NASL stats

1945 births
Living people
English emigrants to the United States
Sportspeople from Weymouth
American soccer players
English footballers
Footballers from Dorset
Association football fullbacks
United States men's international soccer players
English Football League players
North American Soccer League (1968–1984) players
North American Soccer League (1968–1984) indoor players
Weymouth F.C. players
AFC Bournemouth players
Dallas Tornado players
American soccer coaches
English expatriate footballers
English expatriate sportspeople in the United States
Expatriate soccer players in the United States